Crane Building may refer to the following buildings in the United States:

 Crane Company Building (Chicago), Chicago, Illinois, listed on the National Register of Historic Places (NRHP)
 Crane Building (Des Moines, Iowa), listed on the NRHP
 Crane and Company Old Stone Mill Rag Room, Dalton, Massachusetts, listed on the NRHP
 Crane Company Building (North Carolina), Charlotte, North Carolina, listed on the NRHP
 Crane Building (Chattanooga, Tennessee), listed on the NRHP in Tennessee
 Crane Building (Portland, Oregon)
 Crane Co Building of Memphis, Memphis Tennessee